KWOR (1340 AM) is a radio station broadcasting a talk radio format. It is licensed to Worland, Wyoming, United States. The station is currently owned by the Big Horn Radio Network, a division of Legend Communications of Wyoming, LLC, and features programming from FOX News Radio, Westwood One and CBS Radio.

KWOR, KKLX and KVGL studios are located at 1340 Radio Drive, Worland. The KWOR transmitter and tower are at the studios.

History
The station signed on in 1946 as KWOR, operating on 1490 kHz.

On October 1, 2008, KWOR changed their format from oldies to talk. In 2016, the station added an FM translator on 104.7, broadcasting to the Worland area.

During the 1970s their format was a blend of country/western and soft rock.  KWOR was an ABC NEWS and Intermountain Radio Network (IMN)
affiliate.

References

External links

WOR
Radio stations established in 1946
1946 establishments in Wyoming
News and talk radio stations in the United States
Worland, Wyoming